Debolina Dutta is an Indian actress known for her work in Bengali cinema and television. She made her acting debut as a child artist with the film Manush Amanush. In 2014, she received the National Award for her role as a water prostitute in Taan. In 2014, she married actor Tathagata Mukherjee.

She has been targeted by far-right hate groups associated with the Bharatiya Janata Party for her liberal and secular views and food choices. This has resulted in legal proceedings against the perpetrators.

Filmography
 Manush Amanush
 Raja Gaja No Problem (2011)
 Ekla Akash (2013)
 Taan (2014)
 Chotushkone (2014)
 Anubrato Bhalo Acho (2015)
 Ebar Shabor (2015)
 Force (guest) 
 Sesh Anka (2015)
 Bastav (2016)
 Shuopoka, short film (2016)
 Sin Sister double role as twin sisters Piyu and Kuhu (2020)
 Unicorn (2019)
 Borunbabur Bondhu (2019
 Bhotbhoti (2020)
 Rajnandini (2021)

Television
 Ki ashay bandhi khelaghor
 Ek No. Mess Bari
 Shanai
 Janmabhumi
 Ek Akasher Niche
 Raja and Goja, Bindas Moja
 Sokhi
 Durga (Later replaced by Debjani Kaushik)
 Ekhane Aakash Neel
 Nil Simana
 Kobe Je Kothay
 Protibimbo
 Satkahon 
 Shaola
 Mahabharat (2013 TV series) Bengali Dubbed Version as Draupadi [Dubbing Artist]
 Thik Jeno Love Story Andarmahal Ichchhe Nodee Kusum Dola Mirakkel Tin Shaktir Adhar Trishul Sreemoyee Debi Doshomahavidya'', as Devi Tripurasundari, Colors Bangla, Mahalaya, 2022.

Reality shows

Commercials
Debolina has played various roles in Amrutanjan, 
Minu sarees, Keo Karpin hair oil, Anjali jewellers and Rangajoba sindur.

References

Actresses from Kolkata
Actresses in Bengali cinema
Indian film actresses
Indian television actresses
21st-century Indian actresses
Living people
Loreto College, Kolkata alumni
University of Calcutta alumni
Bengali Hindus
Bengali television actresses
1977 births
Bigg Boss Bangla contestants